Marie Rose Louise Constant Morel (26 August 1972 – 8 February 2011) was a Flemish-Belgian politician. She became a member of the Flemish Parliament for the Vlaams Belang in 2004, after leaving the New-Flemish Alliance.

In 1994, Morel was elected Miss Flanders. She was diagnosed with stage IV uterine cancer in 2008. On 8 February 2011, she died from the disease.  She was 38.

1972 births
2011 deaths
Vlaams Belang politicians
21st-century Belgian politicians
21st-century Belgian women politicians
Belgian beauty pageant winners
Deaths from cancer in Belgium
Deaths from uterine cancer
Members of the Flemish Parliament
Beauty queen-politicians